Giovanni Stanchi (1608–1672) was an Italian still life painter.

References

1608 births
1672 deaths
Painters from Rome
17th-century Italian painters
Italian male painters
Italian still life painters